Douwes is a surname. Notable people with the surname include:

Pia Douwes (born 1964), Dutch actress
Eduard Douwes Dekker, Dutch novelist and writer
Ernest Douwes Dekker (1879–1950), Indonesian politician
Brian Douwes (born 1987), Dutch kickboxer